The Scoliidae, the scoliid wasps, are a family of about 560 species found worldwide. They tend to be black, often marked with yellow or orange, and their wing tips are distinctively corrugated. Males are more slender and elongated than females, with significantly longer antennae, but the sexual dimorphism is not as apparent as in the Tiphiidae.

Biology 
Scoliid wasps are solitary parasitoids of scarab beetle larvae. Female scoliids burrow into the ground in search of these larvae and then use their sting to paralyze them. They will sometimes excavate a chamber and move the paralyzed beetle larva into it before depositing an egg. Scoliid wasps act as important biocontrol agents, as many of the beetles they parasitize are pests, including the Japanese beetle. Male scoliids patrol territories, ready to mate with females emerging from the ground. Adult wasps may be minor pollinators of some plants and can be found on many wildflowers in the late summer. 

Scoliidae also has at least one species known to engage in pseudocopulation with an orchid. Flowers of the orchid Bipinnula penicillata in subtropical South America resemble females of Pygodasis bistrimaculata, tricking male wasps into attempting to mate and, in the process, provide pollination. Scoliids include some of the largest wasps in the world, such as Megascolia procer.

Taxonomy

Living scoliidae genera are classified as follows:

Subfamily: Proscoliinae
Proscolia Rasnitsyn 1977

Subfamily: Scoliinae

Tribe: Campsomerini
Aelocampsomeris  Bradley 1957
Aureimeris Betrem, 1972
Australelis Betrem, 1962
Campsomeriella Betrem, 1941
Campsomeris Lepeletier, 1838
Cathimeris Betrem, 1972
Charimeris  Betrem, 1971
Colpa Dufour, 1841
Colpacampsomeris Betrem, 1967
Crioscolia Bradley, 1951
Dasyscolia Bradley, 1951
Dielis Saussure & Sichel, 1864
Extrameris Betrem, 1972
Guigliana Betrem, 1967
Laevicampsomeris  Betrem, 1933
Leomeris Betrem, 1972
Lissocampsomeris Bradley, 1957
Megacampsomeris Betrem, 1928
Megameris Betrem, 1967
Micromeriella Betrem, 1972
Peltatimeris Betrem, 1972
Phalerimeris Betrem, 1967
Pseudotrielis Betrem, 1928
Pygodasis  Bradley, 1957
Radumeris Betrem, 1962
Rhabdotimeris  Bradley, 1957
Sericocampsomeris Betrem, 1941
Sphenocampsomeris  Bradley, 1957
Stygocampsomeris  Bradley, 1957
Tenebromeris  Betrem, 1963Trisciloa Gribodo, 1893Tristimeris Betrem, 1967Tubatimeris Betrem, 1972Tureimeris  Betrem, 1972Xanthocampsomeris Bradley, 1957

Tribe: ScoliiniAustroscolia  Betrem, 1927 Carinoscolia Betrem, 1927Diliacos Saussure & Sichel, 1864 Laeviscolia Betrem, 1928 Liacos Guérin-Méneville, 1838 Megascolia Betrem, 1928Microscolia Betrem, 1928Mutilloscolia Bradley, 1959Pyrrhoscolia Bradley, 1957Scolia Fabricius 1775Triscolia de Saussure 1863
Subfamily †Archaeoscoliinae
The subfamily Archaeoscoliinae is known exclusively from the fossil record, with the largest diversity having lived during the Cretaceous (Barremian) before going extinct by the late Eocene (Priabonian). 
†Archaeoscolia 
†Archaeoscolia hispanica 
†Archaeoscolia senilis 
†Cretoscolia 
†Cretoscolia brasiliensis 
†Cretoscolia conquensis 
†Cretoscolia formosa 
†Cretoscolia laiyangica 
†Cretoscolia montsecana 
†Cretoscolia patiens 
†Cretoscolia promissiva 
†Cretoscolia rasnitsyni 
†Floriscolia 
†Floriscolia relicta 
†Protoscolia 
†Protoscolia imperialis 
†Protoscolia normalis 
†Protoscolia sinensis 

Three additional undescribed specimens from the Ypresian Eocene Okanagan Highlands were referred to the subfamily by S. Bruce Archibald et al. (2018). The two fossils from the Klondike Mountain Formation of Northeastern Washington state, and one fossil from the Allenby Formation of South central British Columbia were mentioned briefly but no specific commentary on placement or finer  taxonomic detail was presented in the paper. 
 History 
In 1847 and 1849 Eduard Eversmann published his "Fauna Hymenopterologica Volgo-Uralensis—exhibiting the species of Hymenoptera which he observed and described in the provinces situated between the Volga river and the Ural mountains." He places the Scoliadae  as a subfamily of the Sphegidae  He mentions the genus Scolia , with 13 species, the genus Tiphia  (3 species) and the genus Meria , with only the species Meria sexpunctata.

North American species list

There are about 20 species in North America north of Mexico. Species include:Campsomeriella annulata (Fabricius 1793) (introduced species, no established population)Micromeriella marginella (Klug 1810) (introduced species, no established population)Colpa octomaculata (Say 1823) – eight-spotted scoliid waspColpa pollenifera (Viereck 1906)Crioscolia alcione (Banks 1917) – Halcyon scoliid waspCrioscolia flammicoma (Bradley 1928)Dielis dorsata (Fabricius 1787) – Caribbean scoliid waspDielis pilipes (Saussure 1858) – hairy-footed scoliid waspDielis plumipes (Drury 1770) – feather-legged scoliid waspDielis tolteca (Saussure 1857) – Toltec scoliid waspDielis trifasciata (Fabricius 1793) – three-banded scoliid waspPygodasis ephippium (Say 1837) – saddleback scoliid waspPygodasis quadrimaculata (Fabricus 1775) – large four-spotted scoliid waspScolia bicincta (Fabricius 1775) – double-banded scoliid waspScolia dubia (Say 1837) – two-spotted scoliid wasp, blue-winged scoliid wasp Scolia guttata (Burmeister 1853)Scolia mexicana (Saussure 1858)Scolia nobilitata (Fabricius 1805) – noble scoliid waspTriscolia ardens (Smith 1855) – fire-tailed scoliid waspXanthocampsomeris completa (Rohwer 1927)Xanthocampsomeris fulvohirta (Cresson 1865)Xanthocampsomeris hesterae (Rohwer 1921)Xanthocampsomeris limosa'' (Burmeister 1853)

References

External links

 Scoliid wasps of Florida. University of Florida IFAS

 
Apocrita families
Biological pest control wasps
Insects used as insect pest control agents